The Lebanese Resistance Brigades (known in Arabic as Saraya al-Muqawama al-Lubnaniya, also known as the Saraya) is a non-denominational Lebanese paramilitary group affiliated with Hezbollah. The irregular militia is composed of Sunni Muslims, Christians, Druze and non-practicing Shiites who subscribe to anti-Israel beliefs. The Resistance Brigades are funded, trained, armed, and founded by Hezbollah. The group's manpower, composition, and strength are unclear.

The group was founded in 1997 to counter Israel, but its focus has since expanded to countering Sunni extremists like ISIL as well.

Founding 
The Resistance Brigades were founded to increase the manpower of anti-Israeli forces in Lebanon and to deny Israel freedom of movement in non-Shia areas. West Point's Combating Terrorism Center reports that the Resistance Brigades were founded in November 1997, while other sources claim early 1990s, 2004, or 2009.

Training 

Resistance Brigade members are trained in Hezbollah-run camps alongside normal Hezbollah recruits. However, they do not receive Hezbollah's ideological training. A recruiter described the group as "made for non-extremist people." The militia is popular among Christians in Beqaa Valley and north Lebanon.

History 

The brigades first saw combat in 1998. They claim to have engaged in over three hundred operations before Israel withdrew from southern Lebanon in 2000. The group was also involved in the 2006 Lebanon War with Israel.

The militia is described as an "operational auxiliary" or subsidiary of Hezbollah. Group members fight under the Hezbollah flag and command structure in combat, but are at least nominally separate in peacetime. They also receive intelligence from Hezbollah.

Involvement in Syria 
Resistance Brigade units have been involved in the Syrian Civil War. They do not engage in combat but rather support Hezbollah logistically and act as interlocutors between Hezbollah and Christian and Sunni communities. Despite this, some fighters have been killed in Syria.

Equipment

Criticism 

Resistance Brigade fighters are less disciplined and subject to less strict rules than Hezbollah fighters. Consequently, the brigades have been involved in a large number of violent confrontations with police, the Lebanese Army, and various Lebanese partisans. Lebanese Interior Minister Nohad Machnouk, member of the Future Movement, criticized the group for challenging the sovereignty of the Lebanese government.

Critics contend that the group is no longer focused on fighting Israel, but rather exists as political cover for Hezbollah's actions and as a containment group for  thugs and troublemakers. Likewise, some Sunnis have charged the Resistance Brigades with focusing more on countering Sunni fundamentalism than Israel.

The Resistance Brigades have also been accused of converting Sunni youth to Shia Islam, a charge the group denies.

References

2006 Lebanon War
Hezbollah